The 2008 Ju-Jitsu World Championship were the 8th edition of the Ju-Jitsu World Championships, and were held in Malmö, Sweden from November 28 to November 30, 2008.

Schedule 
28.11.2008 – Men's and Women's Fighting System, Men's Duo System – Classic
29.11.2008 – Men's and Women's Fighting System, Women's Duo System – Classic
30.11.2008 – Men's and Women's Fighting System, Mixed Duo System – Classic

European Ju-Jitsu

Fighting System

Men's events

Women's events

Duo System

Duo Classic events

Links

References

External links
Medalists from JJIF site (ZIP)